Caihuying is an overpass complex in southwestern urban Beijing.

The main feature is Caihuying Bridge. It links the 2nd Ring Road, which does a turn from south to east, with a connection road to the Jingkai Expressway and another route to the western 3rd Ring Road.

It is one of the few super-overpasses in Beijing to connect more than two roads.

Caihuying is the southwestern edge of the 2nd Ring Road.

Road transport in Beijing